Allison J. Riggs is an American state court judge appointed by Governor Roy Cooper on the North Carolina Court of Appeals.

Riggs has served as co-leader of the Southern Coalition for Social Justice in Durham, North Carolina, and has argued before the U.S. Supreme Court in a Texas redistricting case in 2018 and a North Carolina redistricting case in 2019.

Education

Riggs earned her Bachelor of Arts in Microbiology in 2003, Master's degree in History in 2006 and her Juris Doctor in 2009 all at the University of Florida.

Career

In 2009, Riggs joined the Southern Coalition for Social Justice. She served as a Staff Attorney (2009 - 2014), Senior Attorney (2014 - 2019), Chief Counsel for Voting Rights (2019 - 2022 and Co-Executive Director for Programs (2020 - 2022).

Governor Roy Cooper appointed Riggs to be a judge on the North Carolina Court of Appeals, starting on approximately January 1, 2023. She filled the vacancy on the Court of Appeals created by the election of Richard Dietz to the North Carolina Supreme Court.

Notable cases 

Riggs was part of the legal team that filed a lawsuit challenging North Carolina’s voter law signed by Governor Pat McCrory in August 2013. The case was League of Women Voters of North Carolina, et al. v. North Carolina.   

In 2021, Riggs was part of the legal team in Judicial Watch v. North Carolina. The suit was to compel the State of North Carolina, the North Carolina State Board of Elections, the Mecklenburg County Board of Elections, and the Guilford County Board of Elections to comply with their voter rolls maintenance and record production obligations under Section 8 of the National Voter Registration Act of 1993.

References

External links 
 Appearances at the U.S. Supreme Court from the Oyez Project

Living people
North Carolina Court of Appeals judges
Year of birth missing (living people)